Mary Rogers (c. 1820–1841) was a New York murder victim.

Mary Rogers may also refer to:
Mary Rogers (artist) (1882–1920), American painter and sculptor
Mary Joseph Rogers (1882–1955), founder of the Maryknoll Sisters
Mary Rogers (murderer) (1883–1905), last woman legally executed by Vermont

See also
Mary Rodgers (1931–2014), American composer and author